/x/ can refer to:

 Voiceless velar fricative, represented as /x/ in the International Phonetic Alphabet
 /x/, the Paranormal board on 4chan